Air unit may refer to:

 Aerial warfare
 Air handler
 Carbon credit
 Police aircraft

See also
 Air (disambiguation)
 Unit (disambiguation)
 Air conditioning unit